Pettorazza Grimani is a comune (municipality) in the Province of Rovigo in the Italian region Veneto, located about  southwest of Venice and about  northeast of Rovigo.

Pettorazza Grimani borders the following municipalities: Adria, Cavarzere, San Martino di Venezze.

References

External links 

Cities and towns in Veneto